

Ladder

Ladder progress

Regular season

Squad
Ages are given as of 17 DEcember 2015, the date of the first match played in the tournament
Players with international caps are listed in bold.

Home attendance

References

External links
 Official website of the Brisbane Heat
 Official website of the Big Bash League

Brisbane Heat seasons